The following is a list of recreational trails in Brevard County, Florida. This list includes hiking, biking, equestrian, nature, and multi-use trails administered by various federal, state, county, and city agencies.

Trails

References

External links
Great Florida Birding Trails
Space Coast Hiking
My Florida and other Outdoor Stuff by Tom Choma
Brevard Zoo Linear Park at 100 Florida Trails
East Central Regional Rail Trail at 100 Florida Trails

Protected areas of Brevard County, Florida
Trails
Hiking trails in Florida
Flor